Ministerio Internacional El Rey Jesús, anglicized as King Jesus International Ministry, is a Christian church located in Miami, Florida. The  church has a general attendance of between 15,000 and 20,000 individuals per week. According to Christian News Report, it is the largest Hispanic church in the United States. While the church has long been known as El Rey Jesús, as the church continues to reach out to a multicultural region, the anglicized name of King Jesus Ministry is also known throughout the Miami area. It is also one of the fastest-growing multicultural churches in the United States. The senior pastor of KJM is Apostle Guillermo Maldonado, who gives spiritual coverage to 500 churches in 70 countries, which form the Supernatural Global Network. He is also the founder of the University of the Supernatural Ministry (USM) and a national best-selling author who has written over 50 books.

Structure

Church founders 
The founders of the church are Apostle Guillermo Maldonado and his wife, Prophetess Ana Maldonado. Maldonado arrived in Miami from Honduras, Central America, while his wife, Ana, arrived from Colombia, South America. After nine years of traveling and preaching throughout Central and South America, Maldonado believed that God had called him to establish a ministry in Miami, as a central base, in order to expand the Gospel to the nations of the world.

In June 1996, the Maldonado's family started the church in the living room of their home with 12 members.

Maldonado believes that he has been given a mandate by God to carry out a specific mission in south Florida.  His goal is to convert 12 percent of the population in Miami to the Christian faith. He believes that his life is set apart to establish the Kingdom of God in Miami, the United States, and throughout the world. His specific mission includes working to evangelize and affirm the community and disciple church members, while preparing them to use their newfound faith to in turn, reach out and perpetuate the process of continued evangelization of south Florida and the city of Miami.

Pastor Maldonado's wife, Ana, is considered a prophet by church members at the local, national, and international levels. Ana Maldonado serves the church and community, through intercession and spiritual warfare. Pastor Maldonado has authored books on the kingdom of God, anointing, and healing in various areas of an individual's life; while his wife has authored books on prayer, worship, and spiritual warfare.

Church growth 
Within three months, the small congregation in the Maldonado home grew from 12 to 40 people. They could no longer fit in the living room, necessitating a move to a small neighborhood building. Almost immediately after moving, it became clear to the members that the small building could no longer accommodate the growing congregation. With over 150 people attending the church, a remodeling projection was undertaken, requiring the pastors to temporarily hold services in a banquet hall, since the city, for safety purposes, would not allow remodeling in the midst of regularly scheduled public gatherings.

The banquet hall became a transitional stage in which the faith of the pastors and the church members were tested. The trials served to challenge them to seek God at deeper levels and to care for the people throughout the community who had waited on God for answers to their daily struggles and trials of life.

Church development and construction continued to grow at a steady pace. The increasing congregants quickly outgrew their location when attendance surpassed 250 people. By 1998, the membership grew to over 650 people and four services on Sunday. Over the next ten years, the church membership continued to grow exponentially.

In 2010, King Jesus Ministry has the capacity to reach 7,000 individuals during each service, with general attendance exceeding 15,000 per week. While the majority of the congregants are Hispanic, the church is transitioning into a multicultural, bi-lingual church, offering services in both English and Spanish.

The goal of King Jesus Ministry is to reach the nations of the world by using every means of communication possible, including Internet, radio, television, missionary trips, and by offering missions and evangelistic training for church members, thereby sending them out to continue the ministry of the Church in other areas of the world. To that end, the church has developed affiliated (or daughter) churches based in Naples, Florida; Cape Coral, Florida; Hialeah, Florida; Pequeña Habana, Florida; Orlando, Florida; Marietta, Georgia; Astoria, New York; and Broward, Florida.

Ministries

Orphanage 
On August 19, 2010, the church founded an orphanage in Honduras in the municipality of Langue, in the department of Valle. The town is located near the border of El Salvador.

The orphanage, known as Home House (translated as Casa Hogar in Spanish) has room for about 60 children. Services provided beyond food, clothing, and shelter include spiritual and intellectual education. Together with Apostle Guillermo Maldonado, the home was inaugurated by Honduran President Porfirio Lobo Sosa. Following the dedication ceremony, President Lobo stated the following.
All this contributes to a better Honduras. It is a show of solidarity from a Langue's son, who is a man stationed abroad, but God always keeps he in the very important fact to not forget their roots and not forget his people, especially children who are most vulnerable.

—President Porfirio Lobo Sosa

Media ministry 
King Jesus Ministry has a growing media ministry that includes internet, radio, and television. Television programs are broadcast on Enlace, Daystar, Telemundo Miami, Church Channel, Word Network, Trinity Broadcasting Network, and Mega TV Miami. The radio station is broadcast 24 hours a day in Spanish on Radio Zoe 1430 AM (WOIR).

New Wine Music 

One of the hallmarks of King Jesus Ministry is the praise and worship music. The church has a music ministry led by a worship team named New Wine, offering spiritual and biblically-based lyrics, enhanced by contemporary rhythms and a high-quality sound. The worship time is often accompanied by visual multimedia effects, including light and color.

Conference of the Apostolic and Prophetic (CAP)  

King Jesus Ministry has an annual conference, called CAP (Conferencia Apostólica y Profética in Spanish, Conference of the Apostolic and Prophetic in English). This conference consists of sessions for several days, where speakers are widely known guest preachers in the Pentecostal Christian world. One of the prominent speakers in recent years has been Benny Hinn, Paula White, and Bill Johnson. In the last years this event has taken place in the American Airlines Arena, located in Downtown Miami.

Community involvement 
Apostle Guillermo Maldonado participated in the inauguration of Honduran President Porfirio Lobo, leading the prayer for the president.

During the 2010 Florida Republican Party Gubernatorial primary elections, King Jesus Ministry was visited by the two most prominent candidates, Bill McCollum and Rick Scott, who spoke to the congregation and presented their stand on the issues. Associate Pastor John Laffite served as translator to the mostly Hispanic congregation, encouraging church members to pray for their leaders and exercise their right to vote. Also, Rick Scott attended the church two Sunday's away from Election Day as the then Republican candidate for governor.

Building development 

On June 1, 2004, the church began to actively develop a vision for the expansion of the church property and buildings in order to effectively meet the needs of the church and community. The congregation continued to grow more with each service which made the transition into the next level strategically and feasibly inevitable.

The church attendance eventually grew to the point that six worship services plus a youth service were not enough to accommodate the people or meet their needs. With a sanctuary capacity of 7,000, over 8,000 active members attempted to fill the church each week. While everybody was welcomed, the church was required to comply with legal Fire Marshall codes. Unfortunately, hundreds of people each week were turned away, due to lack of parking or seating space in the sanctuary and overflow rooms provided with televised feed.

The current church property includes worship facilities comprising  with a capacity to simultaneously reach 7,000 people, at a final cost of 18 million dollars; in today's market, the property is worth well over 30 million dollars.

In 2010, King Jesus Ministry expanded its vision beyond the current facilities. Plans include the development and construction of a church campus and temple resembling a sporting stadium or arena with the capacity to accommodate a high volume of visitors exceeding 20,000 people. Church facilities of this magnitude would establish King Jesus Ministry as one of the largest church campuses in the United States.

Affiliated churches 
The church has many affiliated churches, primarily in Florida but a handful outside the state.

Homestead, Florida 
 King Jesus International Ministry of Homestead
 Pastors: Lisandro & Sandra Parra

Hallandale, Florida 
 King Jesus International Ministry of Hallandale 
 Pastors: Israel & Jennifer Rosas

Coral Gables, Florida 
 King Jesus International Ministry of Coral Gables
 Pastors: Michael & Ericka Rodríguez

Carrollton, Texas 
 King Jesus International Ministry of Dallas
 Pastors: Daniel & Carolina Sandoval

Little Havana, Florida 
 Ministerio Manases
 Pastors: Carlos & Clara Valenzuela

Naples, Florida 
 King Jesus International Ministry of Naples
 Pastors: Fredy & Blanca Lagos

Cape Coral, Florida 
 King Jesus International Ministry of Cape Coral
 Pastors: Kerwin & Gloria Castillo

Hialeah, Florida 
 King Jesus International Ministry of Hialeah
 Pastors: Edgar & Mónica Ordóñez

Doral, Florida 
 King Jesus International Ministry of Doral
 Pastors: Dublas & Jessica Rodríguez

Orlando, Florida 
 King Jesus International Ministry of Orlando
 Pastors: Pablo & Alis Vega

Broward, Florida 
 King Jesus International Ministry of Broward
 Pastors: Tommy & Sarahí Acosta

Miami Beach, Florida 
 King Jesus International Ministry of Miami Beach
 Pastors: Frank & Melina Hechavarria

Marietta, Georgia 
 King Jesus International Ministry of Georgia
 Pastors: Mario & Ana Villa

Astoria, New York 
 King Jesus International Ministry of Queens, New York
 Pastors: Leonardo & Liliana Gómez

References

External links 
 El Rey Jesus
 King Jesus Ministry
 Official Facebook page
 Radio Zoe 1430 AM Google translate from Spanish to English

Evangelical megachurches in the United States
Megachurches in California
Churches in Miami
Pentecostal churches in Florida
Christian organizations established in 1996
1996 establishments in Florida